Little Cigars is a film released in 1973 by American International Pictures and was directed by Chris Christenberry.

The film was also released in the United States as The Little Cigars Mob.

Plot
A gang of dwarves team up with a gangster's mistress, played by Angel Tompkins, to go on a crime spree.

Cast
Angel Tompkins - Cleo 
Billy Curtis - Slick Bender 
Jerry Maren - Cadillac 
Frank Delfino - Monty 
Felix Silla - Frankie 
Emory Souza - Hugo 
Joe De Santis - Travers 
Jon Cedar - Faust 
Philip Kenneally - Ganz 
Barbara Rhoades - Helen 
Todd Susman - Buzz
Michael Pataki - Garage Mechanic

See also
List of American films of 1973

References

External links

1973 films
1973 crime films
American crime films
Films about people with dwarfism
1970s English-language films
1970s American films